The Women's time trial at the 2004 UCI Road World Championships took place over a distance of  in Verona, Bardolino, Italy on 28 September 2004.

Final classification

Source

References

Women's Time Trial
UCI Road World Championships – Women's time trial
2004 in women's road cycling